Paul Appleby may refer to:

Paul H. Appleby (1891–1963), theorist of public administration in democracies
Paul Appleby (boxer) (born 1987), Scottish professional boxer
Paul Appleby (tenor) (born 1983), American opera singer